Stagecoach in South Wales is a bus operator providing services in South East Wales. It is a subsidiary of Stagecoach.

A number of operator's licences were used by the company to operate services, however in April 2013 all services were consolidated under the Red & White Services licence. The previous licences were as follows (the names of which generally come from companies which have been acquired in the past):
Aberdare Bus Company Limited (Aberdare Depot)
Crosskeys Coach Hire Limited (Pontllanfraith Depot)
Islwyn Borough Transport Limited (Blackwood Depot)
Parfitts Motor Services Limited (Caerphilly Depot)
Red & White Services Limited (Brynmawr and Cwmbran Depots)
Rhondda Buses Limited (Porth Depot)
The Valleys Bus Company Limited (Brecon Depot and Merthyr Tydfil Depot)

History
In January 1991 Western Travel purchased the eastern division of National Welsh Omnibus Services with 180 buses and depots in Brynmawr, Chepstow, Crosskeys, Cwmbran and Ross on Wye. The operation was renamed Red & White, the area's services having traded as Red & White Services until 1978. In 1992 Western Travel purchased Cynon Valley Transport which operated services in the Aberdare and Merthyr Tydfil areas was purchased with 46 buses.

In February 1992 a 10% shareholding in Rhondda Buses was purchased. Following the December 1991 collapse of National Welsh Omnibus Services, Rhondda Buses was formed to purchase the Caerphilly and Porth depots from the administrators. Rhondda Buses was owned by a consortium of British Bus, Potteries Motor Traction, Stevensons of Uttoxeter and Julian Peddle. In order to quell competition from neighbouring Red & White, Western Travel were sold a 10% share. Services were operated under the Rhondda fleetname from the Porth depot and Caerphilly Busways from the Caerphilly depot. Rhondda had expanded by purchasing the services of Parfitts Motor Services of Rhymney Bridge, who operated in the Merthyr Tydfil (competing with Stagecoach Red & White) and upper Rhymney valley area.

In November 1993 Western Travel was sold to Stagecoach. Red & White was rebranded as Stagecoach Red & White.

In December 1997 Stagecoach bought out the other Rhondda Buses consortium members which were now Arriva, FirstBus and Julian Peddle. Rhondda services were operated under the Stagecoach Rhondda fleetname, whilst the Caerphilly and Rhymney Valley services were incorporated into Stagecoach Red & White.

In February 2000 all operations were rebranded as Stagecoach in South Wales. The Ross on Wye based services were rebranded as Stagecoach in Wye & Dean and transferred to neighbouring Stagecoach West. In September 2000 the services of Phil Anslow Travel were purchased with 28 minibuses, giving Stagecoach a greater presence in the Eastern Valleys.

In November 2004 Stagecoach in South Wales purchased the remaining part of Phil Anslow Travel with six minibuses and 15 coaches. The bus services were integrated into Stagecoach in South Wales, whilst the coaching business became Red & White Coaches. Subsequently Red & White Coaches failed to remain profitable and ceased in April 2006.

In February 2006 Stagecoach purchased Eastern Valleys independent operator Crosskeys Coach Hire who traded as Glyn Williams Travel. Glyn Williams' operating area was within that of Stagecoach in South Wales and many of their trunk services had been operated jointly with Stagecoach.

In 2008 the outstation at Bulwark, Chepstow was closed.

In January 2010 Caerphilly County Borough Council sold its 33 bus Islwyn Borough Transport subsidiary to Stagecoach.

Fleet

As of January 2023, the fleet consisted of 290 buses. The fleet once consisted of Dennis Darts, Volvo B10Ms and Volvo Olympians but now over time it consists mainly of single deckers with double deckerAlexander ALX400 and Alexander Dennis Enviro400 introduced in 2019. 

Until Stagecoach in South Wales began the rebrand in 2022, Stagecoach in South Wales operated the most 'gold' standard vehicles in the entire Stagecoach division. These 'gold' standard vehicles were Alexander Dennis Enviro200 MMC, Alexander Dennis Enviro300, Alexander Dennis Enviro400 and Optare Solo SR.

Stagecoach in South Wales operate TrawsCymru routes using MCV Evora. They also operate the pilot Fflecsi service in Rhondda Cynon Taf and Blaenau Gwent.

The fleet today consists of:

 Wright StreetLite
 Optare Solo
 Optare Solo SR
 Alexander Dennis Enviro200
 Alexander Dennis Enviro200 MMC
 Alexander Dennis Enviro300
 Alexander Dennis Enviro400
 MCV Evora
 Mercedes Mellor Strata

Depots
In April 2014 Stagecoach announced the intended closure of the Brynmawr depot along with a reduction of services. The depot closed on 21 July 2014 and became an outstation of the divisions Head Office.

As of January 2023, Stagecoach South Wales operate six depots in Aberdare, Brynmawr, Caerphilly, Cwmbran, Merthyr Tydfil and Porth.

Blackwood depot closed on 5 February 2023, with its buses and some staff to be moved to the Caerphilly and Cwmbran depots.

See also
Bus transport in Cardiff

References

External links
Company website

Bus operators in Wales
Bus transport in Cardiff
Stagecoach Group
Transport in Caerphilly County Borough
Transport in Monmouthshire
Transport in Newport, Wales
Transport in Rhondda Cynon Taf
Transport in Torfaen
Organisations based in Newport, Wales